State Trunk Highway 173 (often called Highway 173, STH-173 or WIS 173) is a  state highway in Monroe, Juneau, and Wood counties in the central region of the US state of Wisconsin that runs north–south from near Wyeville to Nekoosa. From Valley Junction to Babcock it is built on top of an abandoned former main line of the Wisconsin Valley Railroad (later the Milwaukee Road). Because of this, the highway along this section is very straight.

Route description

For its entire length, WIS 173 is a two-lane road that travels mostly through wetlands of central Wisconsin.

In Valley Junction, WIS 173 turns northeast and continues along that straight heading for just under , until it almost reaches census-designated place of Babcock. Approximately  along this northeastern heading, WIS 173 leaves the Town of Bryon and enters the Town of Scott.

Upon enter entering the Town of Scott, WIS 173 also enters the Meadow Valley Wildlife Area. Just under a mile (1.6 km) northwest of that community is WIS 173's junction with the eastern end of CTH-EW at a T intersection. About a half-mile (0.8 km) past the CTH-EW junction WIS 173 leaves the Town of Scott and Monroe County to enter the Town of Kingston in Juneau County.

Nearly immediately after entering the Town of Kingston, WIS 173 passes through the unincorporated community of Mather, wherein it has two junctions with county trunk highways. The first junction is with the eastern end CTH-HH at the first intersection in the community. The junction with the western end of CTH-H is at the second (and only other) intersection in the community. Roughly  further northeast, WIS 173 leaves the town of Finley and Juneau County to enter the Town of Remington in Wood County.

North of the junction, which is also the northern end of the long and very straight section of the highway, WIS 173 and WIS 80 run concurrently northeasterly to arrive at their junction with the southern end of CTH-X at a T intersection. The WIS 173/WIS 80 promptly crosses over the Yellow River and then enters Babcock. After initially heading due east, the highway turn due north to travel five blocks to the north end of the community. On the north end of Babcock, WIS 173 and WIS 80 reach their northern junction at a T intersection.

Heading east and leaving Babcock, WIS 173 crosses over Hemlock Creek. Promptly after beginning this stretch, WIS 173 leaves the Town of Remington and enters the Town of Port Edwards. Running along the north side of the CN tracks, WIS 173 heads east-northeast for about  until it reaches its junction with the southern end of CTH-D at a T intersection on the western edge of the unincorporated community of Cranmoor. In central Cranmoor, WIS 173 jogs to the southeast for a level crossing over the CN tracks. Approximately  after its junction with CTH-GG, WIS 173 reaches its northern junction with CTH-G at a T intersection. Running concurrently southward with CTH-G for about a half-mile (0.8 km), WIS 173 reaches its southern junction with CTH-G at a T intersection on the western border of Nekoosa.

WIS 173 then turns east again to enter Nekoosa. After running east along Wood Avenue for about a mile (1.6 km), WIS 173 turns north to run along South Cedar Street for about two blocks before turning east again. After about another mile (1.6 km), heading east along Market Street, WIS 173 reaches its northern terminus at a junction with WIS 73 at a Y intersection on the western bank of the Wisconsin River, and the eastern border of Nekoosa.

Major intersections

See also

References

External links

173
Transportation in Monroe County, Wisconsin
Transportation in Juneau County, Wisconsin
Transportation in Wood County, Wisconsin